Cyril-Alex Gockel (born 16 July 1984), known by his stage name C-Real, is a Ghanaian rapper, record producer, entrepreneur, writer and poet. In 2009, he won the Ghanaian edition of the Channel O Sprite Emcee Africa talent show and finished second at the show's finals. He is regarded as one of the leading hip-hop artists in Ghana. He was featured on "Next Up", a song from Coptic's mixtape The Rising Stars of Gh Vol 1 (2012).

Biography and music career
C-Real was born in Hohoe, a town in the Volta region of Ghana. Growing up, he listened to artists such as Ini Kamoze, Das Efx and KRS-One. He and one of his friends formed a rap group called NT, an acronym for Nipa Tumtum. C-Real graduated from St. Peter's Boys Senior Secondary School, and is also an alumnus of the University of Ghana. He started writing poetry, rap verses and basic literature in 2009. C-Real has cited The Notorious B.I.G., Elzhi, Black Thought, Mos Def, Jay-Z, Canibus, Method Man, Eminem, Nas and Busta Rhymes as his key rap influences.

Channel O Sprite Emcee Africa (Ghana) 
In an interview with Richmond Adu-Poku, C-Real said he decided to participate in the Ghanaian edition of the Channel O Sprite Emcee Africa talent show after hearing about it. He advanced to the top 10 round after the first round of auditions and  subsequently battled Padlock, Chymny and Rocky for the crown. After emerging as the winner of the competition, he conducted radio interviews and co-hosted the Brown Berry Show on Choice 102.3 FM.

2009–15: Mixtapes and debut studio album

C-Real told Adu-Poku he was working on a mixtape with his cousin Joseph Deo-Silas and some of his close-knit friends. On November 3, 2009, he released Multiples of C, a 7-track mixtape that features guest appearances from UNO and A.ma. C-Real described the mixtape as an "exhibition mixtape" designed to showcase his versatility. In April 2011, he teamed up with E.L to release Project Hip Hop, a 9-track collaborative mixtape that features guest artists such as Sherifa and Gemini. The mixtape was produced by DJ Juls, E.L and Aphroteq.

C-Real started working on his debut studio album Em C.E.O. at Mix Down Studios. As a prelude to the album, he  released "It's a Rap" and "Kneel, Pray, Rise, Conquer". The latter track is a Gospel-inspired track. Released on December 1, 2012, Em C.E.O features guest appearances from Efya, Chase, E.L, J-Town, Gemini, M.anifest, Lousika, Zeus, Bebelino and Yom da Poet. It was supported by five singles: "I Be The Swag", "Em.Ceo", "Mission Possible", "Opeimu", and "Do the Azonto".

"I Be The Swag" was released as the album's lead single in 2011. The accompanying music video for "I Be The Swag" was directed by Nana Asihene of NKACC. The video was nominated for Best Hip Hop Video at the 2011 4Syte Music Video Awards. The music video for "Em.Ceo" was released on August 17, 2012; it was directed by SABA Arts and uploaded to YouTube. The video was also nominated for Best Hip Hop Video at the 2012 4Syte Music Video Awards.

The Nana Kofi Asihene-directed music video for "Opeimu" was released on July 19, 2013. It was nominated for Best Collaboration of the Year, Best Hip Hop Video, and Best Photography Video at the 2013 4Syte Music Video Awards. In January 2014, C-Real released his third mixtape The Reigning Season; it comprises 10 songs and was recorded in Pidgin, English, Twi, Ewe, and Ga. The mixtape features guest appearances from Stargo Da Don and Johnny Boy. In "One Mic", C-Real pays tribute to American rapper Nas. On February 19, 2015, C-Real released Project Hip Hop 2, his fourth overall mixtape and second collaborative project with E.L. Project Hip Hop 2 comprises 10 songs and features guest appearances from Gemini, Stargo, Ko-Jo Cue, Lil Shaker and Lady J. It was produced by Nel Magnum, DJ Juls and E.L.

Business life
C-Real started out as a junior copywriter at Origin8, a local advertising agency in partnership with Saatchi & Saatchi. He is currently the CEO of MixDown Studios and Pulse Communications. C-Real is also the head of marketing at OG Farms and an avid public speaker.

Personal life
In 2014, C-Real presented a Hyundai Santa Fe to his mother for Valentine's Day.

Awards

4Stye Music Video Awards

|-
|rowspan="3"|2013
|rowspan="3"|"Opeimu" (featuring M.anifest)
| Best Collaboration of the Year
| 
|-
| Best Hip Hop Video
| 
|-
| Best Photography Video
| 
|-
| style="text-align:center;"| 2012
||"Em CEO" (featuring J-Town)
| Best Hip Hop Video
| 
|-
| style="text-align:center;"| 2011
||"I Be Swag"
| Best Hip Hop Video
|

Discography

Studio albums
EM.CEO (2012)
Business Suits & Dress Shoes (2016)

Mixtapes
Multiples of C (2009)
Project Hip Hop (with E.L) (2011)
The Reigning Season (2014)
Project Hip Hop 2  (with E.L) (2015)

References

External links

 
 C-Real at SoundCloud

Living people
1984 births
Ghanaian hip hop musicians
University of Ghana alumni